Gwen Thompson is a Canadian violinist.

Gwen Thompson may also refer to:

Lady Gwen Thompson, American witchcraft author
Gwen Thompson, character in An American Girl: Chrissa Stands Strong